Gustav Peichl (18 March 1928 – 17 November 2019) was an Austrian architect and caricaturist.

Life
He studied at the Academy of Fine Arts Vienna until 1953 and worked in the office of Roland Rainer. To pay for architectural school, he drew caricatures under a pseudonym to protect his identity from the Red Army, which occupied Austria at the time. He first used the name Pei initially and later by the name under which he was best known, Ironimus. He later drew cartoons for major newspapers such as Kurier, Express, Süddeutsche Zeitung and Die Presse.

He opened his own architectural firm in 1955. Peichl built the EFA Radio Satellite Station in Aflenz Austria. He was a member of the international jury that chose Carlos Ott as the architect for the in Opéra Bastille in Paris, in 1983.

He died 17 November 2019 at his home in Grinzing, Vienna, Austria.

Main works
 1969–82 ORF regional studios, in Dornbirn, Eisenstadt, Graz, Innsbruck, Linz, Salzburg
 1985–92 Kunst- und Ausstellungshalle der Bundesrepublik Deutschland, Bonn, Germany
 1987–91 Extension building to the Städel Museum, Frankfurt am Main
 1997–99 with Boris Podrecca and Rudolf F. Weber: Millennium Tower, Vienna
 2000–01 Caricature Museum, Krems

References

External links

Peichl & Partner
Caricatures of Ironimus 

1928 births
2019 deaths
Austrian architects
Austrian caricaturists
Commanders Crosses of the Order of Merit of the Federal Republic of Germany
Honorary Fellows of the American Institute of Architects
Members of the Academy of Arts, Berlin
Members of the European Academy of Sciences and Arts
Süddeutsche Zeitung people